Celestial Seasonings is an American tea company based in Boulder, Colorado, United States. The company specializes in herbal teas (properly called "tisanes"), but also sells green, white, black, and chai teas.

History

Celestial Seasonings founders Mo Siegel, Peggy Clute, Wyck Hay, and Lucinda Ziesing started gathering herbs and flowers in the mountains around Boulder and selling them to local health food stores in 1969.

In the 1970s, Wycks' brother John Hay and Beth Underwood joined the company. They soon created herbal tea blends (such as Sleepytime and Red Zinger) and moved to larger headquarters twice; by 1977 the company began selling internationally. Celestial Seasonings also created and sponsored the Red Zinger Bicycle Classic race in Colorado during the 1970s. The iconic paintings on many of the different tea blends (such as Sleepytime and Red Zinger)  were created by Beth Underwood.  

Celestial Seasonings was purchased by Kraft Foods in 1984. Siegel retired in 1986, and the next year, Kraft announced they would sell Celestial Seasonings to Lipton. The sale was successfully challenged by Bigelow under antitrust laws, and local management purchased the company back from Kraft in 1988.

In 1990, Celestial Seasonings moved into new headquarters in a custom-designed facility in North Boulder. Siegel returned in 1991, to serve as CEO.

Celestial Seasonings merged with natural food company the Hain Food Group in 2000 to form the Hain Celestial Group. Siegel retired for the second time in 2002.

Products
The company's teas are branded using animals, including an anthropomorphic bear for the Sleepytime range.

Legal issues
In 2013 Hain Celestial became one of 25 companies targeted in an ongoing class action lawsuit regarding allegations of falsely labeling their personal care products (including Celestial Seasonings) as 'organic' under California law (California Products Act of 2003) to mislead consumers into purchasing them.

In 2015 Hain Celestial Group reached a settlement and agreed to pay consumers a $7.5 million compensation for mislabeling their products with an additional $2.4 million worth of coupons.

Connection to the Urantia Foundation

In 1969, the same year Mo Siegel and friends collected the herbs in the Colorado Rocky Mountains that would be sold in health food stores and eventually become Celestial Seasonings, Siegel read The Urantia Book, which is a spiritual, philosophical, and religious book that originated in Chicago sometime between 1924 and 1955. The authorship is the subject of speculation, as it is written as if directly from one or more celestial beings. The text was published by the Urantia Foundation in 1955, which provides for the dissemination of The Urantia Book and aims to ensure the text remains unaltered. Mo Siegel currently serves as the President of the Urantia Foundation, and he has said that the morals of the Celestial Seasonings company and the quotes printed on the tea packaging were based on the beliefs and practices of The Urantia Book.

References

External links
Celestial Seasonings Official Website
The Hain Celestial Group
Case 8:13-cv-01757-AG-AN

Tea brands in the United States
Companies based in Boulder, Colorado
American companies established in 1970
1970 establishments in Colorado